Ronald John Rann (25 August 1913 – 30 March 2006) was an Australian rules footballer who played with North Melbourne in the Victorian Football League (VFL).

Notes

External links 

Ron Rann's playing statistics from The VFA Project

1913 births
2006 deaths
Australian rules footballers from Victoria (Australia)
North Melbourne Football Club players
Yarraville Football Club players